In Māori mythology, Manaia was a chief of the mythological land Hawaiki. After his wife's brother Ngātoro-i-rangi had migrated to New Zealand, Manaia's wife, Kuiwai, sent their  daughter Haungaroa and four other girls to tell Ngatoro that Manaia had cursed him. Ngātoro-i-rangi performed rituals to ward off the curse, cursed Manaia in return, and set out for Hawaiki with a force of 140 warriors to take vengeance on Manaia.

Manaia's priests were confident that they would win easily and therefore prepared large ovens for the bodies of Ngātoro-i-rangi's warriors. Ngātoro-i-rangi's men bloodied themselves and  pretended to be dead, thus laying an ambush.  In their over-confidence, Manaia's men advanced recklessly and all Manaia's men and priests were killed; only Manaia himself survived.

Ngātoro-i-rangi and his crew returned to New Zealand. Manaia gathered an army and set sail to New Zealand to attack them. Ngātoro-i-rangi and his wife, however, performed magical incantations, as a result of which Tāwhirimātea, the god of wind and storms, sent a great storm that destroyed Manaia's canoes and killed Manaia himself.

References
R.D. Craig, Dictionary of Polynesian Mythology (Greenwood Press: New York, 1989), 154.
E.R. Tregear, Maori-Polynesian Comparative Dictionary (Lyon and Blair: Lambton Quay 1891), 203–204.

Māori mythology
Polynesian navigators